Rowland Burdon (c. 1757 – 17 September 1838) was an English landowner and Tory politician from Castle Eden in County Durham.

Life
He was the only son of Rowland Burdon, a merchant and banker of Newcastle and Castle Eden and educated at the Royal Grammar School, Newcastle upon Tyne and University College, Oxford. He then took the Grand Tour.

On his return he became a partner in his father's bank, the Exchange Bank in Newcastle and inherited the Castle Eden estate on the death of his father in 1786. He was elected at the 1790 general election as one of the two Members of Parliament (MPs) for County Durham, and held the seat until the 1806 general election, which he did not contest. He was also Mayor of Stockton for 1793–94.

The Castle Eden Vase (or Beaker) was found on his estate in about 1775, by a labourer working on a hedge. The glass vase was a 6th-century Anglo-Saxon "claw beaker" which had been buried beside the skull of human body.
It was presented to the British Museum in October 1947 by his great-great-granddaughter Mrs Sclater-Booth, in memory of her father Rowland Burdon (1857–1944).

He was a prominent Freemason and a member of the Sea Captain’s Lodge, which later became Palatine Lodge No. 97, in Sunderland. He was Worshipful Master of the Lodge in 1792, 4, 5 and 6.

Burdon is mentioned in "Sunderland Bridge", a poem which appears as "anonymous" in The Bishoprick Garland of 1834  by Sir Cuthbert Sharp. (The poem also appears under the authorship of "M W of North Shields" in Rhymes of Northern Bards by John Bell (junior).)  
The comments that are attached to the poem in The Bishoprick Garland state that he was responsible for the splendid bridge which linked the "Northsiders" of Sunderland to the rest of the Town, an achievement which was never fully appreciated, shown by the fact that the bridge had no official name and was called rather indifferently and uninterestedly, Sunderland Bridge, Wearmouth Bridge, or the Iron Bridge.

In 1803 his bank failed after being involved in speculation and he lost much of his fortune.

He died in 1838. He had married twice; firstly Margaret, the daughter of Charles Brandling and secondly  Cotsford, the daughter and heiress of General Richard Matthews, with whom he had 4 sons and 3 daughters.

See also
 The Bishoprick Garland of 1834
 Sir Cuthbert Sharp
 Rhymes of Northern Bards
 John Bell (junior)
 Wearmouth Bridge,

References 

1757 births
1838 deaths
People from Castle Eden
People educated at the Royal Grammar School, Newcastle upon Tyne
Alumni of University College, Oxford
Tory MPs (pre-1834)
Members of the Parliament of Great Britain for English constituencies
British MPs 1790–1796
British MPs 1796–1800
Members of the Parliament of the United Kingdom for English constituencies
UK MPs 1801–1802
UK MPs 1802–1806
19th-century English landowners
Geordie songwriters